Berthod is a surname of French-language origin. People with that name include:

Didier Berthod, Swiss rock climber
François Berthod, French music arranger of airs de cour, 1656, 1658 and 1662
Jérémy Berthod (born 1984), French footballer
Madeleine Berthod (born 1931), Swiss former alpine skier
Marc Berthod (born 1983), Swiss alpine skier
Sylviane Berthod (born 1977), female alpine skier from Switzerland

See also
 Berthold (disambiguation)

French-language surnames
Surnames from given names